Rock It Science is the fifth release by the trip hop/rap rock group Phunk Junkeez, released in 2003. It is their only album to be released on Suburban Noize Records.

Track listing

External links
 http://www.cduniverse.com/productinfo.asp?pid=5720349&activetab=Product%20Detail#Product%20Detail
 http://numetaldescargas.blogspot.com/2010/09/phunk-junkees-2003-rocket-is-science.html

2003 albums
Phunk Junkeez albums
Suburban Noize Records albums